Brock Boyle (born June 14, 1982 in Toronto, Ontario) is a Canadian lacrosse player who plays for the Edmonton Rush in the National Lacrosse League.  He has also played for the Minnesota Swarm, Rochester Knighthawks, Chicago Shamrox, and Albany Attack during his career.

Statistics

NLL

References

1982 births
Living people
Canadian expatriate lacrosse people in the United States
Canadian lacrosse players
Chicago Shamrox players
Edmonton Rush players
Lacrosse defenders
Lacrosse people from Ontario
Minnesota Swarm players
Rochester Knighthawks players
Sportspeople from Toronto
Albany Attack players